Doughty Street Chambers is a British set of barristers' chambers situated in Bristol, Manchester and London's Doughty Street, undertaking criminal justice, public law, immigration, employment, human rights and civil liberties work.

Doughty Street Chambers was set up in 1990 by thirty barristers, aiming to break the mould of traditional chambers by moving out of the Inns of Court. The chambers are now over four times the size with over 120 members, including 29 Queen's Counsels. Geoffrey Robertson is the founder and joint head of Doughty Street Chambers along with Edward Fitzgerald. Other notable members, past or present, include Amal Clooney, Louis Blom-Cooper, Geraldine Van Bueren, Sadakat Kadri, Helena Kennedy, Jennifer Robinson, Ben Silverstone, Keir Starmer, Kirsty Brimelow, Adam Wagner and Shahram Taghavi. Martha Spurrier, now director of the human rights organisation Liberty, remains an associate tenant.

Helena Normanton's nomination for an English Heritage Blue Plaque (unveiled in October 2021 by Brenda Hale) was made by women barristers at Doughty Street Chambers.

References

External links

Doughty Street Chambers website

Law firms established in 1990
Barristers' chambers in the United Kingdom
Law firms based in London